Thitarodes malaisei is a species of moth of the family Hepialidae. It was described by Felix Bryk in 1946 and is known from Myanmar.

References

External links
Hepialidae genera

Moths described in 1946
Hepialidae